Vladimír Dzurilla (August 2, 1942 in Bratislava, Slovakia – July 27, 1995 in Düsseldorf, Germany) was a Slovak ice hockey goaltender playing for Czechoslovakia.

Dzurilla, a refrigerator repairman by profession, was goalie for the Czechoslovak national team for over 16 years, winning three gold, three silver and four bronze medals at world championships as well as one silver and two bronze Olympic medals. However, in most of these tournaments Dzurilla and Jiri Holecek were battling to be Czechoslovakia's top goaltender and each were given their share of games.

For North American fans, he is mostly known for stopping 29 shots in a 1-0 win over Canada in the 1976 Canada Cup (where the Czechoslovaks finished second).

He suffered a fatal heart attack at his home in Düsseldorf, Germany on July 27, 1995, only days before his 53rd birthday.

References

External links

Biography
Vladimír Dzurilla / kolektívne športy 
 

1942 births
1995 deaths
Augsburger Panther players
Czechoslovak ice hockey goaltenders
HC Kometa Brno players
HC Plzeň players
HC Slovan Bratislava players
Ice hockey players at the 1964 Winter Olympics
Ice hockey players at the 1968 Winter Olympics
Ice hockey players at the 1972 Winter Olympics
IIHF Hall of Fame inductees
Medalists at the 1964 Winter Olympics
Olympic bronze medalists for Czechoslovakia
Olympic ice hockey players of Czechoslovakia
Olympic medalists in ice hockey
Olympic silver medalists for Czechoslovakia
SC Riessersee players
Slovak ice hockey goaltenders
Ice hockey people from Bratislava
Medalists at the 1972 Winter Olympics
Medalists at the 1968 Winter Olympics
Czechoslovak expatriate sportspeople in West Germany
Czechoslovak expatriate ice hockey people
Czechoslovak ice hockey coaches
Expatriate ice hockey players in West Germany
Czechoslovak expatriate sportspeople in Switzerland
Czechoslovakia (WHA) players